Helge Jørgensen (footballer, born 1912)
 Helge Jørgensen (footballer, born 1937)